John Maitland, 1st Earl of Lauderdale, Viscount of Lauderdale, Viscount Maitland, and Lord Thirlestane and Boltoun, (died January 1645) was President of the Parliament of Scotland as well as the Privy Council, a lawyer and a judge, who sided with the Parliamentarian cause during the Civil War.

Early life
He was the son of Sir John Maitland, 1st Lord Thirlestane and Jean Fleming, only daughter and heiress of the Fourth Lord Fleming. He was admitted a member of the Privy Council of Scotland on 20 July 1615.

Own Peerage
On 2 April 1616 he was created Viscount of Lauderdale, by Letters Patent, to him and his heirs male and successors in the lordship of Thirlestane.

He was subsequently made President of the Privy Council, and was appointed an Ordinary Lord of Session on 5 June 1618. He was at that time one of the Commissioners for the Plantation of Kirks.

On 14 March 1624, at Whitehall, London, he was created, by patent, Earl of Lauderdale, Viscount Maitland, and Lord Thirlestane and Boltoun.

Later life
Lord Lauderdale was removed from his place on the bench, on 14 February 1626, in consequence of a resolution by King Charles I that no nobleman should hold the seat of an ordinary Lord, and instead was on 1 June following appointed one of the Extraordinary Lords of Session, usually reserved by the Crown for either noblemen or dignitaries of The Church. He remained an Extraordinary Lord until 8 November 1628, and in the following year was appointed one of the Lords of the Articles.

In 1639 he built Brunstane House (sometimes called Gilbertoun) east of Edinburgh as a new mansion house replacing the former mansion which had belonged to the Cricton family.

Regardless of the honours generously bestowed upon him by his monarch, upon the breaking out of the English Civil War, he joined the side of the parliament and was employed in a great variety of commissions of importance.

On 4 June 1644 he was elected President of the parliament, and reappointed on 7 January following. He died before the 20th of the same month, and was interred in the Maitland family burial vault within St. Mary's Collegiate Church, Haddington.

A poetical epitaph on him by Drummond of Hawthornden, as also the one by King James VI on his father, the Chancellor, can be found in George Crawfurd's Peerage.

Marriage and Issue
He married Lady Isabel Seton (d. November 1638), daughter of Alexander Seton, 1st Earl of Dunfermline, celebrated by Arthur Johnston in his poems. They had a large family of whom only three sons and one daughter survived their parents.

Latter Day Saints has Isobel Seton born 3 Nov 1593 daughter of Robert Seton :- 1st Earl of Winton, 8th Lord Seton by his wife Margaret Montgomerie as the wife of John Maitland, this is also the younger sister of Robert Seton 2nd Earl of Winton who had married Ann Maitland the sister of this John Maitland.

Offices and Titles

References

 Anderson, William, The Scottish Nation, Edinburgh, 1867, vol.vi, pp. 633–634.

1645 deaths
Earls of Lauderdale
Extraordinary Lords of Session
Members of the Privy Council of Scotland
Year of birth unknown
16th-century Scottish peers
17th-century Scottish peers
Members of the Parliament of Scotland 1612
Members of the Convention of the Estates of Scotland 1617
Members of the Parliament of Scotland 1617
Members of the Convention of the Estates of Scotland 1621
Members of the Convention of the Estates of Scotland 1630
Members of the Convention of the Estates of Scotland 1643–44
Senators of the College of Justice